Thalia is a town in the Mallee and Mount Jeffcot wards of the local government area of the Shire of Buloke, Victoria, Australia. Thalia post office opened on 14 October 1892 and was closed on 30 June 1969.

References